The swastika curve is the name given by Martyn Cundy and A. P. Rollett in their book Mathematical Models to a type of quartic plane curve.

Equations
The plane curve with the Cartesian equation

or, equivalently, the polar equation

The curve looks similar to the right-handed swastika. It can be inverted with respect to a unit circle to resemble a left-handed swastika. The Cartesian equation then becomes a quartic curve,

References

External links
 

Plane curves
Swastika